Jonathan Thiré (born 19 April 1986 in Nantes) is a French amateur road bicycle racer for Team U Nantes Atlantique.

Palmarès

2007
1st Overall Tour de Gironde
1st Stage 3
2008
5th Paris–Mantes-en-Yvelines
2010
3rd Overall Ronde de l'Oise
7th Route Adélie
2013
1st Mountains classification Boucles de la Mayenne

References

External links
http://jonathanthire.blogspot.com/

French male cyclists
1986 births
Living people
Cyclists from Nantes